Hans Maass (June 17, 1911, Hamburg – April 15, 1992) was a German mathematician who introduced Maass wave forms  and Koecher–Maass series   and Maass–Selberg relations and who proved most of the Saito–Kurokawa conjecture. Maass was a student of Erich Hecke.

Publications

 Maass, H. (1949), "Automorphe Funktionen von mehreren Veranderlichen und Dirichletsche Reihen", Abh. Math. Sem. U. Hamburg 16:72–100.

References

20th-century German mathematicians
1911 births
1992 deaths
National Socialist Motor Corps members